These are all the matches played by the Spain national football team between 1980 and 1989:

Meaning

Results
103 matches played:

References

External links
Todos los partidos (all the games) at Selección Española de Fútbol (official site)

1980s in Spain
1980
1979–80 in Spanish football
1980–81 in Spanish football
1981–82 in Spanish football
1982–83 in Spanish football
1983–84 in Spanish football
1984–85 in Spanish football
1985–86 in Spanish football
1986–87 in Spanish football
1987–88 in Spanish football
1988–89 in Spanish football
1989–90 in Spanish football